Apamea rufus is a moth of the family Noctuidae.

References

Moths described in 1991
Apamea (moth)